Currie House, also known as the Pagoda House, is a historic home located at Blacksburg, Montgomery County, Virginia.  It was built in 1961, and is a -story, square, International Style dwelling constructed of wood, glass, and brick. It features an extensive roof overhang that is underscored by a deck that encircles the building.  The interior has an open-plan room arrangement surrounding a central brick chimney and service core.  The architect, Leonard Currie (1913-1996), was a student and colleague of Walter Gropius and Marcel Breuer.  Leonard Currie was head of the Architecture School at Virginia Tech from 1956 to 1966.

It was listed on the National Register of Historic Places in 1994.

References

Houses on the National Register of Historic Places in Virginia
International style architecture in Virginia
Houses completed in 1961
Houses in Montgomery County, Virginia
Buildings and structures in Blacksburg, Virginia
National Register of Historic Places in Montgomery County, Virginia